Semtex is a general-purpose plastic explosive.

Semtex may also refer to:
 Semtex (album), a 1996 album by The Third Eye Foundation
 Semtex (drink), a taurine-containing energy drink manufactured in the Czech Republic
 DJ Semtex, a BBC hip-hop disc jockey and producer from the UK
 Paul "Semtex" Daley (b. 1983), a British mixed martial artist
 Semtex (anti-slip covering), a type of gritty cement-like compound used on the decks of Royal Navy ships